Bangweulu Twa, or the BaTwa of the Bangweulu swamps, are one of several groups of Twa living in Zambia. Others are Kafwe Twa and Lukanga Twa. They are also known by the names BaTwa or Abatwa. While other Twa groups that are scattered across equatorial Africa are described as pygmy groups and averaging about 1.5 m (4 ft 11 in) in height, the Bangweulu Twa are described as taller and at least partly of Bantu origin but they may be the descendants of former hunter-gatherer groups.

After the coming of various outside Bantu groups to the area, groups of Twa moved to swamps and marsh land territories in Zambia. In descriptions from the early 20th century Bangweulu Twa are said to live off the land, they had no domestic animals but cultivated around ant-hills and on other raised patches. Through trade with inland neighbours they got meal and grain.

Eric von Rosen and the Bangweulu Twa 
Eric von Rosen visited the Twa during his expedition in Bangweulu during 1911 and 1912 and calls them the "Swamp people". Von Rosen collected ethnographica and took photographs which are today in Sweden at the Museum of Ethnography in Stockholm and the Museum of World Culture in Gothenburg.

After 1912 
After von Rosens expedition the Lake dwellers have been steadily moving to the main land. Sleeping-sickness did play an important part in this process.

References 

Ethnic groups in Zambia